Prinsuéjols was a commune in the Lozère department in southern France. On 1 January 2017, it was merged into the new commune Prinsuéjols-Malbouzon. Its population was 145 in 2019.

See also
Communes of the Lozère department

References

Former communes of Lozère